The Soviet Union (USSR) competed at the 1964 Winter Olympics in Innsbruck, Austria.

Medalists

Alpine skiing

Men

Men's slalom

Women

Biathlon

Men

Cross-country skiing

Men

Men's 4 × 10 km relay

Women

Women's 3 x 5 km relay

Figure skating

Men

Pairs

Ice hockey

First round
Winners (in bold) qualified for the Group A to play for 1st–8th places. Teams, which lost their qualification matches, played in Group B for 9th–16th places.

|}

Medal round

USSR 5–1 USA
USSR 7–5 Czechoslovakia
USSR 15–0 Switzerland
USSR 10–0 Finland
USSR 10–0 Germany (UTG)
USSR 4–2 Sweden
USSR 3–2 Canada

Nordic combined 

Events:
 normal hill ski jumping 
 15 km cross-country skiing

Ski jumping

Speed skating

Men

Women

References

Official Olympic Reports
International Olympic Committee results database
 Olympic Winter Games 1964, full results by sports-reference.com

Nations at the 1964 Winter Olympics
1964
Winter Olympics